Mary Hamilton Thomford Sellmer (born September 7, 1902) was the first woman Game warden in California.

Early life
Mary Hamilton Thomford was born in Hayward, California, on September 7, 1902, the daughter of John William Thomford (December 15, 1866 - May 21, 1957 and Mary Hamilton.

Career
On November 22, 1927, Mary Thomford Sellmer was appointed Deputy Game Warden of Marin County, the first woman Game warden in California and the only one in the world in the 1920s. She acted under the supervision of her husband, Captain Walter B. Sellmer, of the State Fish and Game Commission. She was not an "honorary officer" like other women before her, but a full-fledged game warden. In one year since her appointment she arrested forty-seven violators of the game laws. She was an expert rifle and pistol shot. 

In 1929 she was featured in the July number of American Forests. 

She was a member of the Associated Sportsmen's Club of California and the Marin Rod and Gun Club.

Personal life
On January 8, 1923, at Hayward, California, Mary Thomford married Captain Walter Bruno Sellmer (May 16, 1891 - August 20, 1982) and they had one son, William Ross Sellmer (1923-1984). Later Walter Sellmer became Sheriff of Marin County.

She lived at 230 Forest Ave., Fairfax, California.

In 1940 she filed for divorce on dual charges of desertion and extreme cruelty and asked custody of their 16-years-old son and $100 monthly alimony and support for the child.

References

1902 births
Wildlife conservation
Year of death missing
People from Hayward, California
American law enforcement officials
People from Fairfax, California